Christine Mary Kavanagh (born 24 March 1957 in Prescot, Lancashire) is an English actress.

Career overview

Kavanagh was educated in Brussels, and trained as a drama teacher at Bretton Hall College and as an actor at Bristol Old Vic Theatre School. She first appeared in The Onedin Line, followed by a BBC2 Playhouse production before appearing as Nicky in a 1984 episode of Minder. In 1990 she played the lead in the first production (in Scarborough) of Alan Ayckbourne's The Revengers' Comedies, opposite Jon Strickland. In 1985 she appeared in the Doctor Who serial Timelash.

She played Lucy Downes in the Inspector Morse ITV series, in the episode "The Wolvercote Tongue" in 1987, Barbara Hazlitt in a 1989 episode of All Creatures Great and Small, and Dr Alison Wells in the 1991 series Chimera. In 1992 she played the part of Isabel Vandervent in the production of The Blackheath Poisonings produced by ITV. In 1994 she appeared as Penny Winter in eight episodes of Seaforth. The following year she played Rosina Lagrange in three episodes of The Glass Virgin. 

In 2009 she starred as Christine O'Connell in Doctors (after originally appearing as June Mobley three years earlier). She has also been a member of the BBC Radio Drama Company for BBC Radio 4. She played Karen Kenworthy in “Protected”, S4:E2 of Vera in 2014. In 2016, she played Ms Birling in Stephen Daltry's production of An Inspector Calls, and played the Doctor's wife, Patience, in the Doctor Who audio drama Cold Fusion.

Personal life
Kavanagh is divorced from Jack Ellis, with whom she has two children: Theo and Alice. Theo is in the alternative rock band Wolf Alice. Kavanagh founded The Voicehouse, a public-speaking tutoring business.

References

External links

1957 births
Living people
English television actresses
20th-century English actresses
21st-century English actresses
Alumni of Bristol Old Vic Theatre School
Actresses from Merseyside
People from Prescot